The 2019 TCR Australia Touring Car Series season is the first season of the TCR Australia Touring Car Series. The series is run as part of the Shannons Nationals series.

Race calendar 
The calendar was announced in November 2018 with seven confirmed dates. All rounds will be held in Australia.

Teams and drivers
The following teams and drivers are under contract to compete in the 2019 championship:

Results and standings

Race results

Points system

 Two (2) points will be awarded for obtaining Pole Position in qualifying.

Drivers' standings

Notes

References

External links 
Official website

TCR Australia
Australia